STU48 (Setouchi48) is a Japanese idol group and sister group of AKB48 named after the Setouchi Region. It is co-owned by the tourism board of Setouchi Region and is highly involved in their promotional efforts. The group's captain is Mitsuki Imamura and the vice captain is Akari Fukuda.

History

2016–2017: Foundation 

The formation of STU48 was announced in October 2016. The application period for new members was open from January to February 5, 2017. AKB48 members Mayu Watanabe and Yuki Kashiwagi visited the governments of seven Setouchi prefectures (Hiroshima, Yamaguchi, Ehime, Hyogo, Okayama, Tokushima and Kagawa) between them to promote the auditions. On February 22, it was announced that Nana Okada of AKB48 and Rino Sashihara of HKT48 would be concurrent members of STU48 and respectively hold the positions of captain and theater manager. On March 19, 44 applicants who passed the auditions to become first generation members were introduced, and STU48's first generation was formed with 31 members on March 31.

In April, Setouchi Destination Marketing Organization (DMO), the tourism board of Setouchi Region, announced their support of STU48 in the forms of capital investment, business development support, and assistance in coordinating with local governments.

STU48 made their debut performance on May 3 at the Hiroshima Peace Memorial Park as part of the 2017 Hiroshima Flower Festival. Their first independent live show was on June 3 at the Okayama Mirai Hall. Their first music video, "Setouchi no Koe", was also released in June, and the song was included in the AKB48 single "Negaigoto no Mochigusare". They also participated in the AKB48 single "11gatsu no Anklet", performing the B-side "Omoidasete Yokatta".

On November 25, Rino Sashihara canceled her concurrent position to focus on her activities with HKT48.

2018: Debut single, New Artist Award 
On January 16, the variety show , based on AKBingo! and hosted by the comedy duo Maple Chōgōkin (Kazlaser and Natsu Ando), started airing on Nippon TV. It would run for 11 episodes.

STU48's first single, was released on January 31. It sold an estimated 152,003 copies in its first week, according to Billboard Japan. The group also participated in the AKB48 single "Jabaja" released in March, performing the B-side "Pedal to Sharin to Kita Michi to".

On April 14, STU48 theater manager Manabu Yamamoto revealed the ship that would be used for the STU48 theater and announced that it would start operating in summer 2018. However, due to the 2018 Japan floods and other factors, the launch date would be delayed to spring 2019. The release date of their second single, originally planned for August 29, was also postponed to February 13, 2019.

In October, the group announced the formation of five "extra-curricular" subunits. Besides performing music, each of these subunits would also focus on different types of activities. They released their first member guidebook titled  on December 25.

In November, the group was selected as one of the New Artists of The Year for the 60th Japan Record Awards, making them a candidate to win the Japan Record Award for Best New Artist. They are the first group in the AKB48 Group to earn the distinction.

2019: Theater ship launch, second generation recruitment 

On February 13, STU48 released their second single in five versions. The bonus content included DVDs featuring the members modelling the real-life uniforms of Setouchi schools. First week sales reached an estimated 276,000 copies according to Oricon, doubling that of their debut single. The music video for the title song, was shot as one long take by quadcopter drone in Onomichi, Hiroshima and released earlier on December 26, 2018.

On April 16, the group's newly remodeled ship, the STU48-go, was officially launched in a ship commissioning ceremony at Hiroshima Port. The event was live streamed on Showroom and attended by Hiroshima Prefecture governor Hidehiko Yuzaki and other government officials. STU48 performed live in the shipboard theater for the first time that evening, with an original stage play titled "GO! GO! little SEABIRDS!!" produced by Nezumi Imamura.

The group's third single was released on July 31. The title song, was performed by all 29 active members and trainees (Fu Yabushita would be absent as she was on hiatus for health reasons), and each subunit would have their own songs. The music video for the title song was released on July 2. 

Their debut performance took place on the STU48-go on December 21 and 22.

2020: Mitsuki Imamura appointed captain, AKB48 Group singing contest 
STU48's second original stage set list, titled  and produced by then captain Nana Okada, was performed for the first time at the STU48 Theater on the STU48-go on January 11, and included the song  by =LOVE, an idol group produced by former STU48 and HKT48 member Rino Sashihara. In several interviews, various members commented that the stage play was "interesting" and "difficult to express" since there are several songs with themes unfamiliar to the group, such as "queens and slaves" (dominance and submission) and yuri, but also a good learning experience.

On January 18, during STU48's concert at Tokyo Dome City Hall, Nana Okada announced that she would step down as the group's captain and appointed Mitsuki Imamura as her successor and Akari Fukuda as deputy captain, but would retain her concurrent membership. The fourth single title song, was performed live for the first time at the concert. The music video was recorded at the Chichibugahama Beach in Kagawa Prefecture and Ushimado Olive Garden in Okayama Prefecture, and features one of the group's most intense dance routines.

On March 28, due to the COVID-19 pandemic, STU48's third anniversary celebration was held via live streaming on the video service Niconico, where the fifth single was announced to be released on May 27. The music video for the title song, was filmed at the Mitarai preservation district in Kure, Hiroshima and released in two versions for the full members and trainees. The single would include ballots to vote for members of a new subunit called the Setouchi PR Unit, which results were announced on October 18.

In June, the group announced the renewal of the subunits and the formation of sister subunits to the existing ones for the second generation trainees. In July, the online community Setouchi Library was launched, in which members can learn and collaborate in projects related to the Setouchi Region with the group's members and subject matter experts. The service was shut down in March 2022.

On December 1, Yura Ikeda and Nana Okada won the first and third places, respectively, at the third . Honoka Yano also ranked among the top 8 finalists. Among the six member groups of the AKB48 Group, STU48 had the most members advancing to the finals with seven contestants: Yura Ikeda, Honoka Yano, Nana Okada (represented both STU48 and AKB48), Aiko Kojima, Arisa Mineyoshi, Mahina Taniguchi, and Sara Shimizu (dropped out due to health issues). In an interview, Okada commented that the group's achievements in the contest could be attributed to many members having trained since childhood, naming Actor's School Hiroshima as one of the training grounds, and that singing abilities, while not essential for idols, would open many new opportunities for them.

2021–present: Theater ship final tour, Nana Okada's departure, New Wave Project 
On January 15, 2021, STU48 appeared in its first concert at the Nippon Budokan, where they announced the release of their sixth single on February 17 and performed the title song live for the first time. The STU48-go went on its final tour from April 10 to May 23, with the last stop of the tour being Hiroshima Port in Hiroshima City. 

On September 12, during the last day of the STU48 summer tour at Hiroshima Sun Plaza Hall, the seventh single was announced. It was also announced that effective October 2021, all active second generation trainees would be promoted into full members. Nana Okada also announced that she would end her concurrency with STU48 after the promotions of the single has ended. Her last concert with the group was on March 18, 2022, at the Kobe Kokusai Hall.

On September 20, STU48 announced a collaboration with Actor's School Hiroshima called the "New Wave Project", an STU48 trainee recruitment project exclusively for active ASH students, at the 2021 ASH Autumn Act. Four New Wave Project participants were announced to have been accepted as STU48 trainees in February 2022 and started their activities in May.

In January 2022, STU48 members took five of the top 8 finalist positions at the fourth AKB48 Group No. 1 Singing Ability Contest, including the top three: Nana Okada (1st place), Yura Ikeda (2nd), Honoka Yano (3rd), Sara Shimizu (5th), and Mitsuki Imamura (7th). Their eighth single "Hana wa Dare no Mono?" was released on April 13. They held their first concert at the Hiroshima Green Arena on July 11 for their fifth anniversary celebration.

Former shipboard theater 

The former STU48 Theater was situated on a ferry named  and was the first shipboard theater in Japan.

The name of the ship was decided through contest, which was announced on May 11, 2018, by the STU48 management. From around 2000 names which were submitted, 24 were chosen by the members for the final voting by fans on June 30 through the streaming app SHOWROOM, and STU48-go earned the most votes (9.8%), making it the new name of the ship.

The remodeling of STU48-go was carried out at the Japan Marine United facilities in Onomichi, Hiroshima with technical support from the Ministry of Land, Infrastructure, Transport and Tourism, especially concerning safety measures. Several STU48 members visited the shipyard during the process, and Azusa Fujiwara and Honoka Yano personally painted the ship's name on her bow. On January 22, 2019, the group released a music video for the song "Shukkō"  from their then upcoming second single, which was shot on the ship and unfinished onboard theater and performed by all 33 members and trainees active at the time.

On February 25, the group released a list of ports in the Setouchi Region where the ship was planned to dock for performances. On March 19, the certificate of nationality for the ship was issued. The ship was officially commissioned on April 16.

The port and starboard hulls of the ship bore the code "UW2", which means "Welcome" in maritime flag signaling.

On July 15, STU48-go was present at the Marine Day event organized by the C to Sea Project, held at the Port of Tokyo.

On July 9, 2020, the STU48 management announced that the shipboard theater would be decommissioned in the spring of 2021, and that performances would be held around the Setouchi Region with no fixed venue. On February 7, 2021, the ship's last tour was announced, starting on April 10 and ending on May 23, with the last stop of the tour being Hiroshima Port in Hiroshima City. The ship has since been returned to Iki-Tsushima Sea Line and renamed back to Mikasa.

Reception 
In a January 23, 2019 article, Tokyo Sports remarked that STU48 has the "highest level of stage performance" in the AKB48 Group, and that many of its members have a "neat" image similar to that of Nogizaka46. Since Nogizaka46 and the other Sakamichi Series groups do not have their own theaters, STU48 has the opportunity to win over fans who wish for closer interaction through their regular theater performances. The article also predicted that the NGT48 assault scandal, which came to light earlier that month, might cause that group's fans to switch to STU48, in part due to captain Nana Okada's "dislike of disturbance" and "ability to keep the members disciplined".

Awards 
The following table lists some of the major awards received by the group.

Subunits 
These are the active subunits as of July 2022. All members belong to at least one subunit.

Girls' journey units 

The theme of "girls' journey" refers to literally visiting Setouchi tourism destinations and promoting them domestically and overseas and exploring the world of beauty and fashion.

Charming Trip

little Charming Trip

Shikoku units 
These units promote Shikoku, one of Japan's five major islands, especially its less-known interesting places and activities.

Katte ni! Shikoku Kanko Taishi 

All members except Yuka Oki are Shikoku natives.

Katte ni! Shikoku Kanko Guide

Performance units 
The performance units focus on singing and dancing skills.

STUDIO 

On November 15, 2018, Imamura and Miyuna Kadowaki were two of the three 48 Group members (the third being Hijiri Tanikawa of AKB48) selected to become the lead performers for the "No Way Man" live performance in Best Hits Kayosai, replacing the members who transferred to IZ*ONE (namely Hitomi Honda of AKB48 and Sakura Miyawaki and Nako Yabuki of HKT48), after passing the dance audition held by Yomiuri TV.

mini STUDIO

MC & sports units

MiKER! 

MiKER! is a merger between the former MC unit  and sports unit . Kai and Shinano were members of both units.

On November 3, 2018, Kai, Takino, and former Seto 7 member Maiha Morishita participated in the 38th Hiroshima International Peace Marathon.

pin MiKER!

Aoi Himawari 

Aoi Himawari is the only unit which includes a former STU48 member, Miyu Sakaki, and all the other members are concurrently members of other units.

On September 26, 2021, they held their first solo live at the Cave-Be live house in Hiroshima.

Setouchi PR Unit

Original 

Membership into this unit was based on fan voting using the ballots included with the fifth single.

Season 2 

The voting for the second Setouchi PR Unit took place from April 13 to May 2, 2022 using ballots included with the eighth single. The results were announced on May 23.

Members

Regular members

1st Generation 
The first generation members of STU48 originally consisted of 31 people and joined the group on March 31, 2017.

3rd Draft 
The 3rd Draft members were recruited at the third AKB48 Group Draft Conference, a joint audition for AKB48 and all its Japan-based sister groups. Originally consisting of five people, they debuted as trainees in January 2018. Two trainees left the group and the three remaining ones became full members on August 3, 2019.

2nd Generation 
The second generation member recruitment began in August 2019. 24 people who passed the auditions debuted as trainees in December 2019 and the remaining ones became full members in October 2021.

Trainees

New Wave Project
The New Wave Project was a recruitment project exclusively for Actor's School Hiroshima students. Four candidates who passed the auditions debuted as trainees in May 2022.

Former members

Discography

Singles

AKB48 single B-sides 

 "Setouchi no Koe" ("Negaigoto no Mochigusare", 2017), included again in "Kurayami" in 2018
 "Omoidasete Yokatta" ("11gatsu no Anklet", 2017)
 "Pedal to Sharin to Kita Michi to" ("Jabaja", 2018)

References

External links 

 

AKB48 Group
Japanese girl groups
Musical groups established in 2017
Japanese idol groups
2017 establishments in Japan